Moorpark station is a passenger rail station in the city of Moorpark, California. Service commenced in 1983 as an infill station on the short-lived CalTrain line. The station was rebuilt in 1992 to accommodate the new Metrolink Ventura County Line commuter trains. Service on that line began on October 26, 1992; Amtrak's Santa Barbara–San Diego San Diegan trains had begun stopping there the day before. 

Amtrak's Pacific Surfliner from San Luis Obispo to San Diego and Metrolink's Ventura County Line from Los Angeles Union Station to East Ventura stop here.

Moorpark served as the Ventura County Line's terminal until service was extended to Oxnard after the Northridge earthquake in 1994, and now acts as the western terminus of the Ventura County Line except during peak hours in the peak direction of travel. Metrolink stores trains in a small yard a short distance west of the station.

In FY2018, boarding or detraining Amtrak passengers averaged approximately 50 passengers daily.

Historic Moorpark station 
The original Moorpark station was constructed at 18 E. High Street by the Southern Pacific Railroad in 1900. The first station was destroyed by fire in 1909 and was rebuilt in 1910.  It remained in service until the late 1950s and was demolished in 1964.  The former station site is now occupied by the Moorpark Chamber of Commerce.

References

External links 

Moorpark, California
Amtrak stations in Ventura County, California
Bus stations in Ventura County, California
Metrolink stations in Ventura County, California
Railway stations in the United States opened in 1983
1983 establishments in California
Buildings and structures in Moorpark, California
Railway stations closed in 1983
Railway stations in the United States opened in 1992